Tahmina Kohistani (born 8 June 1989, Kapisa Province) is an Afghan runner at 100 metres.

Kohistani competed at the 2012 Summer Olympics in London representing Afghanistan where she made a new personal best of 14.42 seconds in the heats of the 100 metres distance even though she did not advance to the first round. Her previous personal best at the 100 metres was 15.00 at a competition in Bydgoszcz, Poland in 2008. In 2015, she was listed as one of BBC's 100 Women .

References

Afghan female sprinters
Living people
1989 births
Athletes (track and field) at the 2012 Summer Olympics
Olympic athletes of Afghanistan
Athletes (track and field) at the 2014 Asian Games
People from Kapisa Province
Asian Games competitors for Afghanistan
BBC 100 Women
Olympic female sprinters